The James W. Townsend House (also known as the Orange Springs Inn) is a historic home in Orange Springs, Florida. It is located at Main and Spring Streets on the previously owned property of John William Pearson. On October 17, 1988, it was added to the U.S. National Register of Historic Places.

The John W. Townsend House (Orange Springs Inn) in the town of Orange Springs, Florida is significant under criterion B for its association with James Walter Townsend (1864-1944), who was instrumental in developing the turpentine industry in Central Florida during the latter part of the nineteenth century and further contributed to the commercial and economic life of the region
through his activities in banking, ranching, and farming. Also, the wood-frame vernacular house is locally significant under criterion C for its size and distinctive adaptation of vernacular plan types, it is also associated with a natural mineral spring that was an important tourist attraction in pre-Civil War Florida. Furthermore, the house is constructed entirely of locally milled lumber.

References

External links
 Marion County listings at National Register of Historic Places
 Marion County listings at Florida's Office of Cultural and Historical Programs

Houses on the National Register of Historic Places in Florida
National Register of Historic Places in Marion County, Florida
Houses in Marion County, Florida